Jaan Letner (22 December 1887 – 31 October 1960 Tallinn) was an Estonian politician. He was a member of Estonian Constituent Assembly. On 23 April 1919, he resigned his position and he was replaced by Tõnu Talbak.

References

1887 births
1960 deaths
Members of the Estonian Constituent Assembly